The International Encyclopedia of the Social & Behavioral Sciences, originally edited by Neil J. Smelser and
Paul B. Baltes, is a 26-volume work published by Elsevier. It has some 4,000 signed articles (commissioned by around 50 subject editors), and includes 150 biographical entries, 122,400 entries, and an extensive hierarchical subject index. It is also available in online editions. Contemporary Psychology described the work as "the largest corpus of knowledge about the social and behavioral sciences in existence." It was first published in 2001, with a 2nd edition published in 2015. The second edition is edited by James D. Wright.

Subject Classification
Contents include the following broad Subject Classification.

Overarching Topics: Institutions and infrastructure, History of the social sciences and the behavioral sciences, Ethics of research and applications, Biographies, Integrative concepts and issues

Methodology: Statistics, Mathematics and computer sciences, Logic of inquiry and research design.

Disciplines: Anthropology, Demography, Economics, Education, History, Linguistics. Philosophy, Political science, Clinical psychology and applied psychology, Cognitive psychology and cognitive science, Developmental psychology, social psychology, personality psychology and motivational psychology, Sociology

Intersecting Fields: Evolutionary sciences, Genetics, behavior and society, Behavioral neuroscience and cognitive neuroscience, Psychiatry, Health, Gender studies, Religious studies, Expressive forms, Environmental sciences/ecological sciences, Science and technology studies, Area studies and international studies

Applications: Organizational studies and management studies, Media studies and commercial applications, Urban studies and Urban planning, Public policy, Modern cultural concerns

Subclassification of articles with an example
The above Subject Classification is alphabetized with a link for each such general subject at ScienceDirect.Com. Each such link leads to subclassification links for that subject.   The hierarchical classification of articles for a subject can be used to locate an article.  For example, the Economics link above brings up these subclassification links: 
 Agricultural and Natural Resource Economics
 Financial Economics
 General Methods and Schools
 Industrial Organization and Law and Economics
 International Economics, Growth, and Development
 Labor Economics
 Public and Welfare Economics

Each such subclassification link goes to  corresponding Encyclopedia article titles with the author, page numbers, and links to the article Abstract and a View of Related Articles.  (The latter is an extensive list of references separate from the Bibliography in the article.)  For example, under the Economics link above, the link for "General Methods and Schools" brings up:
 Auctions, Pages 917-923, S. Müller | Abstract | View Related Articles
 Behavioral Economics, Pages 1094-1100, S. Mullainathan and R. H. Thaler ...
 Consumer Economics, Pages 2669-2674, A. P. Barten
 Econometric Software, Pages 4058-4065, W. H. Greene
 Econometrics, History of, Pages 4065-4069, M. S. Morgan and D. Qin
 Economic Education, Pages 4078-4084, W. E. Becker
 Economics and Ethics, Pages 4146-4152, J. Broome
 Economics, History of, Pages 4152-4158, M. Schabas
 Economics, Philosophy of, Pages 4159-4165, D. M. Hausman
 Economics: Overview, Pages 4158-4159, O. Ashenfelter
 Expectations, Economics of, Pages 5060-5067, G. W. Evans and S. Honkapohja
 Experimental Economics, Pages 5100-5108, V. L. Smith
 Feminist Economics, Pages 5451-5457, D. Meulders
 Firm Behavior, Pages 5676-5681, F. M. Scherer
 Game Theory: Noncooperative Games, Pages 5873-5880, E. van Damme
 Information, Economics of, Pages 7480-7486, S. S. Lippman and J. J. McCall
 Institutional Economic Thought, Pages 7543-7550, G. M. Hodgson
 Macroeconomic Data, Pages 9111-9117, T. P. Hill
 Market Areas, Pages 9203-9207, J.-C. Thill
 Marxian Economic Thought, Pages 9286-9292, R. Bellofiore
 Monetary Policy, Pages 9976-9984, B. M. Friedman
 Political Economy, History of, Pages 11649-11653, K. Tribe
 Post-Keynesian Thought, Pages 11849-11856, G. C. Harcourt
 Psychiatric Care, Economics of, Pages 12267-12272, S. Tyutyulkova and S. S. Sharfstein
 Psychology and Economics, Pages 12390-12396, K. Fiedler and M. Wänke
 Science, Economics of, Pages 13664-13668, W. E. Steinmueller
 Search, Economics of, Pages 13760-13768, C. A. Pissarides
 Transaction Costs and Property Rights, Pages 15840-15845, O. E. Williamson

The abstract for each article can be linked from the article link.  An example of an Abstract link is that for the article "Economics: Overview" above.

See also
 Economics handbooks
 List of encyclopedias by branch of knowledge
 International Encyclopedia of the Social Sciences (1968)
 The New Palgrave: A Dictionary of Economics (1987)
 The New Palgrave Dictionary of Economics, 2nd Edition (2008)

References

Further reading

External links
 Official website: 2nd ed., 1st ed.

American encyclopedias
Social sciences literature
21st-century encyclopedias
Encyclopedias of science